Qiladar (Urdu: قلعہ دار) is a small historic village, in Gujrat District in Punjab, Pakistan, situated some 25 km west-ward, from main Gujrat city at the bank of Upper Jhelum Canal.No one knows who historically inhabited this village; neither any history book has any mention of Qiladar. Un-written stories, common among the people, however, tell how a bandit named Thakar Ketee Singh had managed to establish his rule in and around this area in 16th century AD. He made his abode on a mound which is now the central point of the village. People use to call this mound as Thakar Dawara. He was very cruel, as the folk stories goes, and his main source of income was plundering in adjacent areas especially muslim majority dwellings. Mughal emperor Jahangir (1569–1627) had discussed, in his memoir Tuzuk-e-Jahangiri, many such bandits and clans who made the writ of Mughal empire confined only to the fort in Gujrat, made by Akbar. To redress the sufferings, Prince Khurram, then governor of Lahore province (later titled Shah Jahan at his emperorship) honored Mirza Bazan Baig with all this land and made him the Qiladar (an honorary designation of that time) in 1620. Bazan Baig, a cousin of Aurangzaib, was married to princess Mihr-un-Nissa Begum more  commonly known as Ladli Bano. The real royal order of qiladari and his Nikah Nama was available in the personal library of Moulana Muhammad Alam, a worthy son of Qiladar.

Mirza Bazan Baig pruned the area from those bandits, constructed a fortress and established the order. He is usually portrayed as a revered person in local folk stories. He also constructed a beautiful mosque, titled Shahi Masjid, besides a madrassa. The mosque was styled in Mughal architecture; three domes, with a bigger at the center, over the main praying area.

Later in Sikh era (1799–1839), a fire temple was being built by Dewan Dena Nath. It was a beautiful building built with white marble. There is also a Hindu temple, Dhottee Sahib, build in 1884. Both of these temples, were also made with religious schools. Pandit Manas Razdan, who belonged to the family of Bhaskar Razdan who wrote the commentary on 60 sayings of Lalleswari to Sanskrit verse, was a saint who was forced to migrate to Qiladar in 1770 during Pathan rule in Kashmir under Governor Amir Khan Jawansher, and opened an Ashram which became the central point for Kashmiri Pandits.

One of the legendary personality of Qiladar was Moulana Muhammad Alam (1873-1955) who was the biological descendant of pioneer immam, of Shahi Masjid, Moulana Khan Muhammad,  who was designated by Mirza Bazan Baig himself. Muhammad Alam was a scholar in sharia and fiqah, besides a prolific writer in Arabic & Persian languages, and a hakeem serving the ailing humanity. He leads prayers, teach Quran, and spends his time in writing religious works. This made him extremely reverend not only in Qiladar but in adjacent areas. In 1950,  heavy floods badly damaged the Shahi Masjid. He planned rebuilding and renovation. However,  he was running short of funds and it was feared that the building project wouldn't be completed. As the saying goes, a bucket full of gold coins, of Shah Jahan era, ushered while digging for the mosque. It was a God given bounty. However,  he duly informed the authorities which gifted back a big chunk of these coins for the construction. This made Not only the building possible but also multiplied his reverence. The current structure of the mosque is the same what he built. He is buried at the corner of the same mosque. 

Moulana Khan Muhammad, Dr. Ahmed Hussain Qureshi, are some other worth mentioning sons of the soil.


Populated places in Gujrat District